Balby South is a ward in the metropolitan borough of Doncaster, South Yorkshire, England.  The ward contains three listed buildings that are recorded in the National Heritage List for England.  All the listed buildings are designated at Grade II, the lowest of the three grades, which is applied to "buildings of national importance and special interest". The ward contains part of the suburb of Balby and part of the village of Warmsworth.  The listed buildings in the ward consist of a church, and a large house, later a hospital and then offices, and associated structures.


Buildings

References

Citations

Sources

 

Lists of listed buildings in South Yorkshire